DYUP is a call sign assigned to two radio stations owned by the University of the Philippines Visayas in the Philippines:

 DYUP-AM, an AM radio station broadcasting in Iloilo City
 DYUP-FM, an FM radio station broadcasting in Iloilo City